Esther & Abi Ofarim were an Israeli musical duo active during the 1960s, consisting of husband and wife Abi Ofarim and Esther Ofarim. They enjoyed particular success in Germany. They had hits in Europe with their songs "One More Dance," "Morning of My Life," and "Cinderella Rockefella."

Career 
Esther Zaied (b. June 13, 1941) met guitarist and dancer Abraham "Abi" Reichstadt (October 5, 1937 – May 4, 2018) in their native country, Israel, in 1958. Esther, who had been singing since she was a child, was a student in Abi's dance studio in Haifa. They married on December 11, 1958. After Esther served four months in the Israeli Army, they began singing at home for fun before pursuing a professional music career together. Esther joined the group Ofarim, which was founded by Abi and Shmulik Kraus in 1958. The group changed its name to the Ofarim Trio and performed around Haifa, but Shmulik soon left the group.  

Esther and Abi continued performing as a duo in nightclubs. They appeared as performers in the first German-Israeli feature film Burning Sands (1960). The duo rearranged old Jewish songs and released their debut album, Haofarim (Sings Israelic Ballads), on Israphon Records in 1961. In 1961, Esther won the first place in Israel's Song Festival. Esther and Abi released the album, Foibles and Fables, in 1962. Both albums were successful and were frequently played by the Kol Yisrael radio. Kol Israel sent Esther to the Sopot International Song Festival in Poland where she placed second.

In 1963, Esther and Abi settled in Geneva, Switzerland, and recorded songs in French, Italian, Hebrew and English for the local radio station Radio Suisse Romande. Esther represented Switzerland in the 1963 Eurovision Song Contest. After she placed second in the competition, the duo began recording for Philips Records in Germany. While appearing in the United States, they recorded an album of folk songs released as Esther Ofarim & Abraham. In Germany, the album was titled Songs der Welt (Songs of the World), peaking at No. 2 on the German Albums chart. They had a hit in the Netherlands with "One More Dance (Your Husband Is Worse)," which was released in December 1963 and reached No. 8 on the Dutch charts in 1964.

In 1966, Esther & Abi Ofarim had a hit with "Noch einen Tanz," which peaked at No. 32 in Germany and No. 6 in Austria. In December 1966, they donated $2,500 to the Delphin Foundation for Crippled Children in Germany. The gift was in appreciation of the response by the German public to their albums Neue Songs Der Welt (New Songs of the World) and Das Neue Esther & Abi Ofarim Album (The New Esther & Abi Ofarim). They became the top-selling pop act in West Germany since the war. Their album The New Esther & Abi Ofarim, which was produced by Abi, topped the German pop charts for many weeks. Their albums had sold more than one million copies in Germany alone by 1967.

At the height of their success in Germany, the duo were banned on Israeli Radio for a few years due to Germany–Israel relations. Despite the ban, which was implemented in 1963, The New Esther & Abi Ofarim was released as Sing Hallelujah! in Israel on Litratone Records in 1966.  The duo achieved their biggest hit in Germany with "Morning of My Life", which was written by the Bee Gees, peaking at No. 2 in 1967. They performed the song on the television special Gala-Abend der Schallplatte 1967 (Gala Disk Evenings 1967), the first color telecast in Europe, transmitted by Eurovision from Berlin.

In 1967, Esther & Abi Ofarim embarked on a successful international tour which included performances in the US and at The Savoy in London. Later that year, they released the album 2 In 3, which topped the German Albums chart and reached No. 6 on the UK Albums chart. The duo also received their third gold disk for one million international album sales.

While appearing on The Smothers Brothers Comedy Hour in 1967, the duo were presented with the song "Cinderella Rockefella", a novelty love duet written by Mason Williams and Nancy Ames. Esther & Abi Ofarim's performance of the song on the UK television show The Eamonn Andrews Show catapulted the song to success on the charts. It topped the UK Singles chart for three weeks in early 1968 and sold half a million copies. The single peaked at No. 68 on the US Billboard Hot 100 and reached the top 10 in several European countries. The duo had a successful top 20 follow-up single in the UK with "One More Dance," an English version of their 1966 German single "Noch einen Tanz."

In 1968, Esther & Abi Ofarim performed at Midem in Cannes, the Majorca Pop Jazz Festival in Spain, and the Grand Gala du Disque in Holland. They also performed for Queen Elizabeth at a Royal Variety Performance in London.

Recordings made during their European tour in 1969 were released as the live album Ofarim Concert – Live 1969, charting at No. 29 in the UK. Artistic differences strained the couple's relationship. They performed their last concert together in Cologne in March 1969 before separating. Their divorce was finalized in 1970.

Selected discography

Duo albums

 1961 : Ha Ofarim (The Roes) (Israphon AP 201)
 1962 : Mousar Adin (Foibles and Fables) (Israphon AP 210)
 1963 : Esther Ofarim and Abraham (Songs der Welt) (Philips B48051L-840458BY-840438PY-PHM200102-PHS600102)
 1964 : Melodie einer Nacht (Philips P48104L)
 1965 : That’s Our Song (Neue Songs der Welt) (Philips BL7698-652204BL-843750PY, Litratone 12135MS)
 1966 : Noch einen Tanz (Philips 843775PY)
 1966 : Sing Hallelujah (Das Neue Ofarim Album) (Philips BL7757-P48141L-843920PY, Litratone 12134 MS)
 1967 : 2 in 3 (GER-UK-ESP-ISR) (Philips 838807JY-620209JL-620210JL, Phonodor 13004)
 1967 : Cinderella-Rockefella (FR) (Philips 844301BY)
 1967 : Cinderella-Rockefella (USA) (Philips PHS600269)
 1968 : Up to Date (GER-UK-ISR) (Philips 838808JY, Phonodor 12196)
 1969 : Ofarim Konzert-Live 1969 (GER) (Philips H72AM201)
 1969 : Ofarim Concert – Live 1969 (UK) (Philips 88422DY)
 1969 : Ofarim Concert – Live (USA) (Philips PHS600330)
 1972 : Rak Ivrit (Hebrew only) (Phonodor 13034)

Charted albums

Compilation albums 

 1965: Ester en Abraham Ofarim / Lieder und Songs (Philips)
 1967: Esther + Abi Ofarim (Philips)
 1967: 2. Folge (Philips)
 1968: Songs & Hits (Philips)
 1972: Esther & Abi Ofarim (Philips)
 1972: Die Ofarim-Story (Philips)
 1997: Songs of Our Life (Mercury)
 2002: Meisterstücke (Mercury)

Charted singles

References

External links 

 Esther & Abi Ofarim on AllMusic

Musical groups established in 1960
Musical groups disestablished in 1969
1960 establishments in Israel
1969 disestablishments in Israel
Married couples
Israeli musical duos
Folk music duos
Pop music duos
Male–female musical duos
Schlager groups
Israeli expatriates in Germany
Jewish musical groups
Israeli pop music groups
Philips Records artists